Andrew Joseph McDonald (born 8 March 1958) is a British Labour politician and solicitor. He served as Shadow Secretary of State for Transport in Jeremy Corbyn's shadow cabinet from 2016 to 2020, and as Shadow Secretary of State for Employment Rights and Protections under Keir Starmer before resigning in September 2021. He has been the Member of Parliament (MP) for Middlesbrough in the House of Commons since 2012. He is a member of the Socialist Campaign Group parliamentary caucus.

Early life
Andy McDonald was born in Acklam, Middlesbrough, in the North Riding of Yorkshire.

He was educated at a number of local schools, including St. Francis Primary School, St. Edward's Primary School and St. George's Secondary School (which later became Trinity Catholic College, Middlesbrough). He attended St. Mary's Sixth Form College before studying for a law degree at Leeds Polytechnic.

Legal career
McDonald worked as a solicitor for over 25 years, as a senior solicitor at the Middlesbrough office of Thompsons Solicitors and to lead the firm's Serious Injury Unit for the Cumbria, Humberside, North East, and Yorkshire areas. He was also the firm's Head of Military Claims for members of the British Armed Forces. Whilst working for the firm, McDonald acted as a special adviser to the House of Commons Defence Select Committee for its 2003 report on Armed Forces Pensions and Compensation. He has also served as both Chair and as Secretary of the Association of Personal Injury Lawyers' Military Special Interest Group and was a founder member of The Royal British Legion's Solicitors Group.

Early political career
McDonald was active in local politics in Middlesbrough for many years. He served as councillor for Westbourne ward from 1995 to 1999. At the time of his selection as a parliamentary candidate, he was chairman of Middlesbrough Labour Party Local Government Committee.

Labour shortlisted McDonald as a potential candidate for the Middlesbrough South and East Cleveland constituency in the 2010 United Kingdom general election. However, Tom Blenkinsop was the eventual choice.

Parliamentary career
McDonald became a parliamentarian when he won the Middlesbrough by-election held on 29 November 2012, retaining the seat for Labour following the death of Sir Stuart Bell. McDonald increased the party's share of the vote to 60.5%, though his majority was reduced by 500 to 8,211.

Since his election to Parliament, he has campaigned on a number of issues including opposition to the "Bedroom Tax" (part of the Welfare Reform Act 2012) and the privatisation of the East Coast Main Line.

In February 2013, he was appointed Parliamentary Private Secretary (PPS) to Emily Thornberry, Shadow Attorney General.

Following the Ed Miliband's shadow cabinet reshuffle in October 2013, he became Parliamentary Private Secretary to Chuka Umunna in Umunna's role as Shadow Secretary of State for Business, Innovation and Skills.

In January 2016, McDonald was appointed to Jeremy Corbyn's shadow ministry to replace Jonathan Reynolds, who resigned as Shadow Minister for Rail in protest after Corbyn sacked Pat McFadden.

In June 2016, he was appointed Shadow Transport Secretary as part of the Labour Party's post-Brexit reshuffle.

In April 2020, incoming leader Keir Starmer moved him to Shadow Secretary of State for Employment Rights and Protections. McDonald was the chair of Labour's "Power in the Workplace Taskforce" which provided input into Labour's Employment Rights' Green Paper published in September 2021. The paper stated that "Labour is demanding that the minimum wage is immediately raised to at least £10 per hour for all workers". In September 2021, McDonald resigned as Shadow Secretary, citing lack of support from Starmer for an increase in the minimum wage to £15. He said he had been instructed by Starmer's office to argue at the Labour Party Conference "against a national minimum wage of £15 an hour and against statutory sick pay at the living wage".

Trustee and governor roles
McDonald was a governor of Abingdon Primary School for fifteen years until 2010 and became a governor of Middlesbrough College in 2012. He has also been chair of two charities in his constituency, the Davison Trust, which works with children with special needs, and the Teesside branch of Headway, which works with people with brain injuries.

References

External links
Official website

Profile at Middlesbrough College
Profile at Thompsons Solicitors 

|-

|-

1958 births
Living people
Alumni of Leeds Beckett University
Councillors in North East England
English people of Irish descent
English Roman Catholics
English solicitors
Labour Party (UK) MPs for English constituencies
People from Middlesbrough
UK MPs 2010–2015
UK MPs 2015–2017
UK MPs 2017–2019
UK MPs 2019–present